Two-up is a traditional Australian gambling game, involving a designated "spinner" throwing two coins or pennies into the air. Players bet on whether the coins will fall with both heads (obverse) up, both tails (reverse) up, or with one coin a head and one a tail (known as "Ewan"). It is traditionally played on Anzac Day in pubs and clubs throughout Australia, in part to mark a shared experience with Diggers through the ages.

The game is traditionally played with pennies – their weight, size, and surface design make them ideal for the game. Weight and size make them stable on the "kip" and easy to spin in the air. Decimal coins are generally considered to be too small and light and they do not fly as well. The design of pre-1939 pennies had the sovereign's head on the obverse (front) and the reverse was totally covered in writing, making the result very easy and quick to see. Pennies now are marked with a white cross on the reverse (Tails) side. Pennies can often be observed being used at games on Anzac Day, as they are brought out specifically for this purpose each year.

History

The exact origins of two-up are obscure, but it seems to have evolved from cross and pile, a gambling game involving tossing a single coin into the air and wagering on the result. Two-up was popular amongst poorer English and Irish citizens in the 18th century.

The predilection of the convicts for this game was noted as early as 1798 by New South Wales's first judge advocate, as well as the lack of skill involved and the large losses. By the 1850s, the two-coin form was being played on the goldfields of the eastern colonies, and it spread across the country following subsequent gold rushes.

Two-up was played extensively by Australia's soldiers during World War I. Gambling games, to which a blind eye was cast, became a regular part of Anzac Day celebrations for returned soldiers, although two-up was illegal at all other times.

As time passed, increasingly elaborate illegal "two-up schools" grew around Australia, to the consternation of authorities  but with the backing of corrupt police. The legendary Thommo's Two-up School, which operated at various locations in Surry Hills, Sydney, from the early years of the 20th century until at least 1979, was one of Australia's first major illegal gambling operations.

The popularity of two-up declined after the 1950s as more sophisticated forms of gambling like baccarat gained popularity in illegal gaming houses as well as when poker machines (slot machines) were legalised in clubs.

Legal two-up arrived with its introduction as a table game at the new casino in Hobart in 1973, but is now only offered at Crown Perth and Crown Melbourne. Two-up has also been legalised on Anzac Day, when it is played in Returned Servicemen's League (RSL) clubs and hotels. Several tourist "two-up schools" in the Outback have also been legalised.  Under the NSW Gambling (Two-Up) Act 1998, playing two-up in NSW is not unlawful on Anzac Day.

The table below show the current bets that can be made at Crown Perth.

Gameplay 

The Ringie selects a player as the spinner (generally greeted to loud calls of "Come in, Spinner!" from the rest of the players). The spinner tosses the coins in the air using the kip until they win (and continue spinning), lose (and the kip is offered to the next player around the ring), or toss the kip (take their winning wagers and retire).

The basic format of the game:
 Two heads means the spinner wins.
 Two tails means the spinner loses both their bet, and the right to spin.
 Odds ("one them") means head or tail bets are frozen, and the spinner throws again.

The spinner is required to place a bet (usually on heads) before their first throw which must be covered (equaled) by another player. If the spinner wins they keep the bet and cover, minus a commission which the boxer takes out of this bet. If the spinner loses, the entire bet goes to the player who covered the bet. This makes throwing the coins a slight losing proposition compared to a side bet, however this is balanced by the interest of throwing the coins and the chance of adding a personal "lucky" touch to the spin. The disadvantage (cost of running the game) is shared about the School by the Kip being passed about the Ring during subsequent spins.

As a betting round and subsequent spin takes about a minute, and is resolved win/loss on average every three spins, then the Boxer's commission on wins is paid on average ten times per hour. i.e. If the Spinners' average wager is $20, covered by $20, and the commission is 10% then the Boxer will take $40 an hour in commission. The taking of commission has been made illegal for unlicensed games in most states, even when play is permitted (e.g. ANZAC day).

The other members of the school place side bets (bets against each other) on whether the coins will Head or Tail. These bets are offered by shouting the amount and preference (i.e. "Fifty dollars head!) perhaps while tapping the money on their head, until another player who wishes to bet on the opposite coin approaches them to cover the bet. The combined amount of the bet is traditionally held by the tail-better until the bet resolves (i.e. Heads is thrown, and the combined bet is handed over to the head-better, or Tails is thrown and the combined bet is pocketed by the tail-better.) This usually results in the heavier/wealthier betters taking the "tails" bet, allowing them to cover a number of "heads" bets on each throw.

Variations 

Some variations include:
 Throwing three coins, instead of two: As at least two coins will always match, this results in a decision on every throw (two heads or two tails, with the third coin being redundant - "sudden death"), and thus a faster game, with more action, as the bets are resolved on every throw - there is no pause in gambling when odds are thrown.
 The spinner only wins after a successive run of heads: I.e., if three heads are required before a tails, with any number of odds, then "odds, heads, odds, odds, heads, odds, heads" would be a win. Casinos pay this at 7.5 to 1. This speeds up play as the Spinner can't "Toss the Kip" after a single throw (selecting a new spinner takes time, interrupting play).
 If the spinner throws successive odds they lose: I.e., if five odds thrown before a tails loses while three heads are required to win, then "odds, heads, odds, odds, heads, odds, odds" would be a loss. Casinos use this rule to provide them with the edge they need to run the game, as the Casino collects all Head/Tail bets if five odds in a row are thrown.
 In Casino games the Spinner may bet on either heads or tails. 
 In Casinos, no side bets are permitted; all bets are placed with the Casino as bank.

Popular culture 
On 17 November 2004, the Premier of New South Wales remarked in the New South Wales Legislative Assembly:

In 1978, the Australian group Little River Band released their fourth album Sleeper Catcher, which featured the band and others on the cover playing the game. In the liner notes it says:

The protagonist of C. J. Dennis' 1915 verse novel The Songs of a Sentimental Bloke suffers from an addiction to playing two-up.

The Australian rock group AC/DC has a song called "Two's Up" on their 1988 Blow Up Your Video album that references the game.

In the 1960 film Hell Is a City set in Manchester, England, there is a scene in which robbers use stolen money to join in a gang of local men gathered on a hill behind the town to gamble "the toss". A thrower balances two pennies on two outstretched fingers and then tosses them high in the air to see how they land. The thrower wins with double heads and loses with double tails. Other men in the crowd cover his bets (bet against him), with a "boxer" handling the money and keeping track of the bets. Lookout men with binoculars and whistles sat by upper windows of nearby buildings to warn of police arriving.

The film The Sundowners contains a sequence in which a group of Australian drovers, including Robert Mitchum's character, play a game of two-up, with appropriate bets. One of the players calls out "fair go", which translates roughly as "play fair". Appropriately, the action in the game on-screen is rapid and without hesitations or false starts. In the 1940 film Forty Thousand Horsemen, the three leads, played by Grant Taylor, Chips Rafferty, and Pat Twohill, are introduced to us playing two-up in a market place.

The 1971 film Wake in Fright contains scenes where the main protagonist, a schoolteacher named John Grant, staying in a semi fictional mining town based on Broken Hill for one night, initially makes significant winnings in a game of two-up, before subsequently losing everything again.

The book Come In Spinner takes its name from the call. There is also a sequence in the film The Shiralee starring Bryan Brown which makes reference to the game.

During the broadcast recording of the 'Tin Symphony' segment of the opening ceremony of the 2000 Olympic Games there are two scenes of settlers playing two-up outside a tin home.

The Australian-themed 2002 video game Ty the Tasmanian Tiger features a tutorial area named "Two-Up".

In 2009, the television program Underbelly: A Tale of Two Cities shows men taking part in games of two-up.  In one instance the police enter the establishment in which this is taking place and the contestants run and hide the equipment being used and money being gambled.

In 2014, the television program Peaky Blinders depicts a game of two-up, with a car and a horse used for betting.

On 20 February 2015, a game of two-up featured in The Doctor Blake Mysteries, series 3, episode 2, titled "My Brother's Keeper".

Notes

References
 Australian gambling – Comparative history and analysis- report published by the Victorian Casino and Gaming Authority

External links

 Description of two-up as played by 2/12th Commando Squadron on the Australian War Memorial official website.
 History of the two-up set used by NX203594 Private Milton George Heuston, 2/12 Commando Squadron on the Australian War Memorial official website.
 Newspaper report of a police raid on an illegal two-up school (The Advertiser, Adelaide: 12 December 1931, page 17).

Australian gambling games
Coin games
Sports originating in Australia
Military sports